The 1993–94 FA Cup qualifying rounds opened the 113th season of competition in England for 'The Football Association Challenge Cup' (FA Cup), the world's oldest association football single knockout competition.  A total of 539 clubs were accepted for the competition, down 22 from the previous season’s 561.

The large number of clubs entering the tournament from lower down (Levels 5 through 8) in the English football pyramid meant that the competition started with five rounds of preliminary (1) and qualifying (4) knockouts for these non-League teams.  The 28 winning teams from Fourth round Qualifying progressed to the First round proper, where League teams tiered at Levels 3 and 4 entered the competition.

Calendar

Preliminary round

Ties

Replays

2nd replays

1st qualifying round

Ties

Replays

2nd replays

2nd qualifying round

Ties

Replays

2nd replays

3rd qualifying round

Ties

Replays

4th qualifying round
The teams that given byes to this round are Slough Town, Stafford Rangers, Bath City, Kidderminster Harriers, Altrincham, Kettering Town, Merthyr Tydfil, Witton Albion, Macclesfield Town, Southport, Farnborough Town, Sutton United, Aylesbury United, Hayes, Crawley Town, Marlow, Cheltenham Town, Accrington Stanley, Marine and V S Rugby.

Ties

Replays

2nd replays

1993-94 FA Cup
See 1993-94 FA Cup for details of the rounds from the first round Proper onwards.

External links
 Football Club History Database: FA Cup 1993-94
 The FA Cup Archive

Qual
FA Cup qualifying rounds